Saruhashi is a bridge in Ōtsuki, Yamanashi, Japan.

Saruhashi may also refer to:

People with the surname
, Japanese geochemist
Nozomu Saruhashi, Japanese businessman

Other uses
Saruhashi Prize, an award for Japanese women scientists founded by Katsuko Saruhashi
Saruhashi Station, a railway station in Yamanashi Prefecture, Japan

Japanese-language surnames